Club Atlético El Linqueño is a sports and social club that primarily plays football. It is located in the city of Lincoln, Buenos Aires, Argentina.

External links
Soy de El Linqueño 

 
Association football clubs established in 1915
Football clubs in Buenos Aires Province
Lincoln, Buenos Aires
1915 establishments in Argentina